Vangjush Dako has served as the  mayor of the city of Durrës, Albania. He was elected to the post following the February 2007 local elections. He is a member of the Socialist Party of Albania.

Vangjush Dako was born in Durrës, on 29 November 1966. He attended Tirana University's School of Engineering, where he graduated in 1991.

References

See also 
Durrës

Living people
People from Durrës
Mayors of Durrës
1966 births
University of Tirana alumni
Socialist Party of Albania politicians